Olle Wänlund (12 September 1923 – 11 January 2009) was a Swedish cyclist. He competed in the individual and team road race events at the 1948 Summer Olympics.

References

External links
 

1923 births
2009 deaths
Swedish male cyclists
Olympic cyclists of Sweden
Cyclists at the 1948 Summer Olympics
Sportspeople from Stockholm